Full Moon High is a 1981 American comedy horror film written and directed by Larry Cohen.

Plot
The film is about a teenager who goes on a trip to Transylvania with his father and gets bitten by a werewolf. Made ageless, he attempts to put his life back together a couple of decades later by enrolling in high school. He initially tries to keep his secret from the school and the three women who show interest in him — a sexually active high school student, his own former girlfriend (now a married mother of one), and one of his teachers. He ignores sexual advances because it is his "time of the month." He later encourages the female high school student to film his transformation. She, and the students who later watch the film, mistake the footage at first for a stag film, but after people watch the whole film he is arrested for the crimes he committed while in wolf form. He, as the wolf, escapes prison in time to participate in his high school's homecoming football game. There he is gunned down by a psychiatrist (played by Alan Arkin) but survives because inflation has rendered a single silver bullet insufficient to kill a werewolf.

Cast
 Adam Arkin as Tony Walker
 Ed McMahon as Col. William P. Walker
 Roz Kelly as Jane
 Joanne Nail as Ricky
 Bill Kirchenbauer as Detective Jack Flynn
 Kenneth Mars as Coach / Principal Cleveland
 Elizabeth Hartman as Miss Montgomery
 Alan Arkin as Dr. Brand
 Louis Nye as Reverend
 Demond Wilson as Cabbie / Busdriver
 Cheryl Lockett Alexander as Pregnant Teenager
 Jim J. Bullock as Eddie
 Tom Aldredge as The Jailer
 Tom Clancy as Priest
 Laurene Landon as Blondie
 John Blyth Barrymore as Student
 Bob Saget as Sportscaster
 Pat Morita as Silversmith
 Armando G. Fernandez as School Dance Dancer
 Julius Harris as Hijacker(uncredited)

Production
The film was filmed partially at John Burroughs Senior High School in the city of Burbank, California, in the summer of 1979.  A portion of this movie was also filmed on location in Lyndhurst, New Jersey, on the football field in Bergen County Park at the foot of Valley Brook Avenue and River Road. The stands were filled with everyone from the town, and the varsity football team of that year were featured.

External links
 
 
 
 

1981 films
1981 horror films
American comedy horror films
American high school films
1980s English-language films
Films directed by Larry Cohen
Films set in Transylvania
Films shot in California
Films shot in New Jersey
American werewolf films
1980s comedy horror films
Filmways films
1981 comedy films
Films with screenplays by Larry Cohen
1980s American films